December 14 - Eastern Orthodox liturgical calendar - December 16

All fixed commemorations below celebrated on December 28 by Eastern Orthodox Churches on the Old Calendar.

For December 15th, Orthodox Churches on the Old Calendar commemorate the Saints listed on December 2.

Saints
 Hieromartyr Eleutherius, Bishop of Illyria, and Martyrs Anthia (his mother), Coremonus the Eparch (Corybus), and two executioners who suffered with them. (117-138)
 Martyr Eleutherius of Byzantium (beginning of the 4th century)  (see also: August 4)
 Martyr Susanna the Deaconess, of Palestine (4th century)
 Venerable Pardus the Hermit, of Palestine (6th century)
 Saint Stephen the Confessor, Archbishop of Surozh in the Crimea (c. 790)
 Monk-martyr Bacchus of St. Sabbas Monastery (Bacchus the New), by beheading (late 8th century)
 Venerable Paul of Mt. Latros (Paul the New Ascetic) (896 or 956)

Pre-Schism Western saints
 Saint Valerian of Abbenza, Bishop of Abbenza in North Africa (457)
 Martyrs Faustinus, Lucius, Candidus, Caelian, Mark, Januarius and Fortunatus, in North Africa.
 Saint Mesmin (Maximin, Maximinus), first Abbot of Micy (Saint-Mesmin de Micy Abbey) near Orleans in France (520)
 Saint Aubertus, Bishop of Cambrai-Arras (Netherlands) (668)  (see also: December 13)
 Saint Florentius (Flann), Abbot of Bangor Abbey in Ireland (7th century)
 Saint Offa of Essex, King of Essex in England, he went to Rome and took up the monastic life (c. 709)
 Saint Urbicius (Urbitius, Úrbez) (c. 805)
 Saint Adalbero (Adalbero II of Upper Lorraine), a monk at the monastery of Gorze in France, became Bishop of Verdun, but was transferred to Metz (1005)

Post-Schism Orthodox saints
 Saint Nectarius of Bitel (Nektarios of Bitola, Nektarij Bitolski) (1500)
 Saint Tryphon of Pechenga or Kola, "Enlightener of the Lapps" (1583), and his martyred disciple Jonah (1590)

New martyrs and confessors
 New Hieromartyr Hilarion (Troitsky), Archbishop of Verey (1929)
 New Hieromartyrs Alexander Rozhdestvensky and Basil Vinogradov, Priests of Tver (1937)
 New Hieromartyr Victorinus Dobronravov, Priest (1937)
 New Hieromartyr Joseph, Metropolitan of St. Petersburg (1938)
 Virgin-martyr Victorina (Diobronravova).

Other commemorations
 Commemoration of the ordination of St. John Chrysostom as the Patriarch of Constantinople (15 December 397).
 Synaxis of the Saints of the Crimea.
 Synaxis of the Saints of Kola (Kolsk).
 Glorification (1997) of Saint Peter (Mogila), Metropolitan of Kiev (1646)  (see also: December 31 )

Icon gallery

Notes

References

Sources
 December 15/28. Orthodox Calendar (PRAVOSLAVIE.RU).
 December 28 / December 15. HOLY TRINITY RUSSIAN ORTHODOX CHURCH (A parish of the Patriarchate of Moscow).
 December 15. OCA - The Lives of the Saints.
 The Autonomous Orthodox Metropolia of Western Europe and the Americas (ROCOR). St. Hilarion Calendar of Saints for the year of our Lord 2004. St. Hilarion Press (Austin, TX). p. 93.
 December 15. Latin Saints of the Orthodox Patriarchate of Rome.
 The Roman Martyrology. Transl. by the Archbishop of Baltimore. Last Edition, According to the Copy Printed at Rome in 1914. Revised Edition, with the Imprimatur of His Eminence Cardinal Gibbons. Baltimore: John Murphy Company, 1916.
Greek Sources
 Great Synaxaristes:  15 ΔΕΚΕΜΒΡΙΟΥ. ΜΕΓΑΣ ΣΥΝΑΞΑΡΙΣΤΗΣ.
  Συναξαριστής. 15 Δεκεμβρίου. ECCLESIA.GR. (H ΕΚΚΛΗΣΙΑ ΤΗΣ ΕΛΛΑΔΟΣ). 
Russian Sources
  28 декабря (15 декабря). Православная Энциклопедия под редакцией Патриарха Московского и всея Руси Кирилла (электронная версия). (Orthodox Encyclopedia - Pravenc.ru).
  15 декабря (ст.ст.) 28 декабря 2013 (нов. ст.). Русская Православная Церковь Отдел внешних церковных связей. (DECR).

December in the Eastern Orthodox calendar